Vincent Bouchiat (born 1970) is a French condensed matter physicist.

Education 
Vincent Bouchiat followed his studies in Paris partially at the Lycée Henri-IV. In 1993, he received an engineer degree from the School of Industrial Physics and Chemistry of Paris ESPCI in 1993 and a master's degree in solid state physics from the University of Paris, Pierre & Marie Curie.  After completing his Ph.D. at Quantronics group in CEA-Saclay in 1997 under the supervision of Michel Devoret and Daniel Estève, he received a CNRS position the same year at University of Marseilles.

Research 

Bouchiat's PhD dissertation is recognized as a pioneering study in the field of quantum computing hardware, showing the quantum superposition of charge states in a single Cooper pair box. This experiment paved the way for the realisation of a charge qubit.

Dr Bouchiat's research interests cover a wide range of solid state physics and multidisciplinary investigations which include quantum information, superconductivity, carbon nanostructures ( graphene and carbon nanotubes), bioelectronics and translational research research in medical sciences .

Career 
Dr. Bouchiat is a CNRS permanent fellow since 1997. He is director of research at the French National Centre for Scientific Research (CNRS), associated with the Néel Institute at CNRS Grenoble.

In 2007, Bouchiat was invited professor at the Physics department of University of California, Berkeley.

In 2019, Vincent Bouchiat co-founded the company Grapheal of which he is currently CEO, a startup focussing on the healthcare applications of graphene.

Awards 
In 2007, he received the Visiting Miller Professorship award from Miller Institute at University of California, Berkeley . He also won in 2017, the Lee-Hsun Research Award from the Chinese Academy of Sciences (Institute of Metal Research).

References 

20th-century French physicists
Condensed matter physicists
Pierre and Marie Curie University alumni
ESPCI Paris alumni
1970 births
Living people
21st-century French physicists
Research directors of the French National Centre for Scientific Research